Kiri is a greatest hits album released by New Zealand opera diva, Kiri Te Kanawa in 2001.

This unique compilation is a comprehensive study of Kiri Te Kanawa's most memorable moments. It features 20 tracks from 4 different labels. Tracks include arias from the Marriage of Figaro, Tosca, La Traviata, and her famous O Mio Babbino Caro. Also included is Let the bright Seraphim by Handel, which Te Kanawa sang at the Royal Wedding of HRH Prince Charles and Diana, Princess of Wales in 1981.

Track listing
 "Let the bright Seraphim" - Handel (Samson)
 "Dove sono" - Mozart (Le nozze di Figaro) (Solti)
 "Laudate Dominum" - Mozart
 "Ave Maria" - Bach-Gounod
 "Attendo, Attendo... Addio del passato" - Verdi (La traviata)
 "Vissi d'arte" - Puccini (Tosca) (Solti)
 "O mio babbino caro" - Puccini (Gianni Schicchi)
 "Ecco: respiro appena. Io son l'umile ancella" - Cilea (Adriana Lecouvreur)
 "Chi il bel sogno di Doretta" - Puccini (La rondine)
 "Depuis le jour" - Charpentier
 "Pie Jesu" - Fauré (Requiem)
 "Baïlèro" - Canteloube (Chants d'Auvergne)
 "Tonight" - Bernstein (West Side Story)
 "Summertime" - Gershwin (Porgy and Bess)
 "Someone To Watch Over Me" - Gershwin
 "Smoke Gets In Your Eyes" - Kern
 "Let's Face The Music and Dance" - Berlin
 "True Love" - Porter
 "The World You're Coming Into" - McCartney
 "World in Union" - Gustav Holst / Skarbek

References 

Kiri Te Kanawa albums
2001 greatest hits albums
2001 classical albums